Shane Parris (born 10 November 1990 in Amsterdam) is a Dutch footballer who played for Eerste Divisie club FC Oss during the 2009-2010 football season.

References

External links
voetbal international profile

Dutch footballers
Footballers from Amsterdam
TOP Oss players
Eerste Divisie players
1990 births
Living people
Association football forwards